"Arrest the President" is a political song by American rapper Ice Cube, released by Interscope Records on November 9, 2018. It is the lead single from Ice Cube's tenth studio album Everythang's Corrupt. Although he is not mentioned by name, it is directed at US President Donald Trump, containing a refrain to "Arrest the President; you got the evidence". The song's video is a montage of Trump clips.

Background
The song was noted for its overtly political stance following Ice Cube previously having commented on his feeling that Trump has not acted on issues that affect the black community in the United States, and strongly denying on Twitter that he would ever support Trump.

Lyrics
Along with lyrics about treating the White House like a "trap house" and that "These motherfuckers never take the trash out", Ice Cube refers to the accusations of Russian collusion in the 2016 election, calling Trump "Russian intelligence", with the song's refrain deemed a "plea" to Robert Mueller to arrest Trump.

Critical reception
Along with being called politically charged by Rolling Stone and Pitchfork, NME called the song an "attack" on Trump, saying Ice Cube "couldn't be clearer" on its refrain.

See also
Russian interference in the 2016 United States elections

References

2018 singles
2018 songs
Ice Cube songs
Songs about Donald Trump
Songs written by Ice Cube